Wake Me Up may refer to:

 Wake Me Up (EP), or the title track, by Aloe Blacc, 2013
 "Wake Me Up" (Avicii song), 2013
 "Wake Me Up" (Foals song), 2021
 "Wake Me Up" (Girls Aloud song), 2005
 "Wake Me Up" (Mai Kuraki song), 2014
 "Wake Me Up" (Remy Ma song), 2017
 "Wake Me Up" (Taeyang song), 2017
 "Wake Me Up" (Twice song), 2018
 "Wake Me Up", a song by B.A.P, 2017
 "Wake Me Up", a song by Billy Currington from Summer Forever, 2015
 "Wake Me Up", a song by Ed Sheeran from the 2011 album +
 "Wake Me Up!", a song by Speed from Rise, 1998
 "Wake Me Up (When This Nightmare's Over)", a song by Simple Plan from Harder Than It Looks, 2022

See also
 Don't Wake Me Up (disambiguation)
 "Wake Me Up Before You Go-Go", a 1984 song by Wham!
 
  "Wake Me Up When September Ends", 2004 song by Green Day